Tseung Kwan O Hospital, located in Hang Hau, Tseung Kwan O, Hong Kong, is a district general hospital providing secondary care services for the Sai Kung and Tseung Kwan O communities.

The hospital has 667 beds.

Services

Specialities
24 hour Emergency department
Anaesthesiology and Operating Theatre Services
Combined Endoscopy Unit
Coronary Care Unit
Ear, Nose and Throat
Electrographic Diagnostic Unit
Family Medicine & Primary Health Care
Gynaecology (including Obstetrics out-patient services)
High Dependency Unit
Intensive Care Medicine
Orthopaedics and Traumatology
Ophthalmology (mainly on ophthalmology out-patient services)
Paediatrics and Adolescent Medicine
Pathology
Radiology and MRI Centre
Specialist Out-patient Department
Surgery

References

Extra areas operated by NT taxis
Hang Hau
Hospitals in Hong Kong